Volumes 1 & 2 is the first full-length album by The Desert Sessions. It features the ten tracks found on the original 10-inch EPs.

This album differs from subsequent collaborative Desert Sessions in that it was recorded solely by Josh Homme's band The Acquitted Felons.

Track listing

Notes
The two "Girl Boy Tom" tracks are actually part of a single song. "Monkey in the Middle" is crammed between the two tracks with a fade out from "Girl Boy Tom" and fade back into "Girl Boy Tom". Thus the title "Monkey in the Middle" is a sort of play on titles, being the monkey in the middle. 
"Robotic Lunch" uses a different mix than found on the original EP.

Personnel
Josh Homme: vocals, guitar, keyboards, bass, percussion
John McBain: guitar, keyboards
Fred Drake: guitar, drums, keyboards, percussion
Dave Catching: guitar, bass, synthesizer, percussion
Ben Shepherd: bass, guitar
Brant Bjork: drums, bass, percussion
Alfredo Hernández: drums, percussion
Pete Stahl: vocals

References

02A
1998 compilation albums
Man's Ruin Records compilation albums